The Terrex Infantry Carrier Vehicle (ICV) is an armoured fighting vehicle (AFV) developed by ST Engineering of Singapore and Timoney Technology of Ireland, and produced by ST Engineering Land Systems (a corporate subsidiary of ST Engineering) for the Singapore Army as well as by Turkish auto-maker Otokar (manufacturing it under a license) as the Yavuz (AV-82) for the Turkish military.

The Terrex's mass is approximately 25 to 30 tonnes and the vehicle is built on an 8x8 wheeler chassis with modern military vehicle armour. Multiple-type weapon platforms are supported on the vehicle, including both remote-type weapon systems and overhead weapon stations (OWSs).

ST Engineering Land Systems is marketing the Terrex to potential buyers in Asia, South America and the Middle East.

Production history and development

The Terrex project started off as a government funded project to help develop a new generation of armoured personnel carriers for the Singapore Armed Forces. Singapore Technologies Kinetics, a subsidiary of Singapore Technologies Engineering, was chosen to design and manufacture the vehicle. The prototype Terrex AV81 armoured fighting vehicle was exhibited for the first time at DSEi 2001. The initial AV-81 design utilised conventional coil-spring shock absorbers but later variants introduced of hydro-pneumatic struts with real-time damping control. An electric-hybrid drive system was also developed. Designed with a modular protection system it is one of the latest and most advanced APCs with an all round protection against 7.62 mm NATO rounds and artillery shell splinters, front arc withstands 12.7 mm armor piercing-rounds at the most basic armor package. Ceramic-composite armor package are available for a higher level of protection. Maximum level of all-round protection is against 14.5 mm armor-piercing rounds. The vehicle has a double V-shaped hull, which deflects mine blasts and withstand up to 12 kg TNT explosion under the hull with the vehicle still able to move. Vehicle is fitted with NBC protection system and battlefield management system for better awareness.

Terrex AV81 APC variant is armed with a remotely controlled 40 mm automatic grenade launcher and coaxial 7.62 mm machine gun. Its modular top-deck system means it can be fitted with remotely-controlled 12.7 mm machine gun, 20–30 mm cannon or anti-tank guided missile to a 105 mm cannon. This armored vehicle is also available in various turret-mounted armament configurations, but number of personnel carried is reduced. The Terrex can be airlifted by a C-130 Hercules or similar cargo aircraft.

By mid-2004, one prototype and one pre-production model had been built and both were evaluated throughout Asia and Europe, where the vehicle was offered for a number of emerging wheeled armoured vehicle requirements. This was further influenced by the emerging United States' Interim Brigade Combat Team (IBCT) concept, which called for the need of wheeled armoured fighting vehicles (AFV) as opposed to tracked AFVs.

The Singapore Armed Forces will acquire at least 135 Terrex ICVs to replace its V-200 armoured vehicles, with all active Infantry and Guards battalions to begin training to operate from the vehicle in February 2010. The Second Battalion, Singapore Infantry Regiment, recently acquired the Terrex as part of its shift into a motorised infantry battalion. The Indonesian Army has plans to purchase 420 units and has also expressed intent to produce the Terrex locally under license. Turkish automaker Otokar has also joined with ST Engineering Land Systems to produce the Terrex AV-82 (renamed Yavuz) for the Turkish Armed Forces.

Terrex AV-82
The Terrex AV-82 (Turkish Otokar variant)  was developed in 2005 equipped with a more advanced driveline and hydro-pneumatic suspension system, and a number of changes from the AV81 including a flat underbody instead of a V-shaped hull, and revised rear suspension.

Terrex 2: MPC/ACV
In August 2012, the U.S. Marine Corps awarded SAIC a developmental contract for the Terrex for the Marine Personnel Carrier program.

On 18 July 2013, SAIC, along with ST Engineering Land Systems and Armatec Survivability Corporation, successfully completed two weeks of evaluations of the Terrex at Camp Pendleton.  The tests included a series of water performance demonstrations in various sea conditions and an evaluation of human factors and stowage capacity. The Terrex completed all required surf transit and ocean swim maneuverability tests at its fully loaded combat weight.  It demonstrated load capabilities through successful stowage of gear and supplies that Marines would require for three days of operations, with space available for additional equipment.  The human factors evaluation demonstrated the spacious interior by accommodating the specified number of combat-equipped Marines and enabling rapid tactical and emergency egress through a quick-release hatch.  The Terrex repeated ocean swim and maneuverability results were achieved in a March 2013 rehearsal event.  SAIC began ballistic and blast tests at the Nevada Automotive Test Center in May 2013, and was scheduled to complete all ballistic and mine blast demonstrations in July.

The Marine Personnel Carrier was put on hold in June 2013, restarted in February 2014, and then restructured as Phase 1 of the Amphibious Combat Vehicle (ACV) program, which includes the previous MPC competitor entries.

The Terrex 2 was publicly unveiled in September 2015 at the DSEI 2015 convention.

On 24 November 2015, the Marines selected the SAIC Terrex, along with the BAE Systems/Iveco SuperAV, to move on to the engineering and manufacturing development phase of the ACV 1.1 program.  SAIC was awarded a $121.5 million contract to build 16 vehicles by late 2016 for testing.  The Terrex submitted for the ACV program, called the Terrex 2, was designed to enhance situational awareness, with the troop commander's station equipped with a screen covering all aspects outside the vehicle, also visible to the squad to enable them to see what they would be exiting to. The driver's station was equipped with several screens with obstacle avoidance, situational awareness sensor feeds, and other features. Although the Terrex is specialised in ground operations, it also meets the minimum requirements for safe sea operation. The Terrex has a V-over-V hull that creates a crush zone to reduce the impact of a blast on the floor; this creates a spacious interior. Footrests attached to seats across the aisle keep the Marines' feet from absorbing blast energy.  The vehicle uses a central tire inflation system, can swim  in water, and has excess buoyancy of 23 percent. It weighs 32.5 tons, carries three crew and 11 embarked Marines, and can reach  on paved roads.

In June 2018, the Marine Corps selected BAE Systems for the ACV program.

Terrex 3: Australian Army: LAND 400 Program
Referred in Australia as the Sentinel 2, it was specially developed by ST Engineering and Elbit Systems of Australia (ELSA) to meet the Australian Army's requirement for an armored reconnaissance vehicle.  A further development of the Terrex 2, it is better protected and carries a much more powerful armament but lacks amphibious capability due to its 35 tonne weight. Designed with  Elbit Land System's MT30 modular turret, the vehicle is operated by a crew of 2 and can carry 11 dismounts. It was outbidded by the Rheinmetall Boxer CRV in early 2018.

Design
As with a number of other recent wheeled armoured vehicles, the Terrex is of modular design with various levels of armour protection and weapon systems being marketed up to a gross vehicle weight of 24,000 kg. Despite its size, the Terrex is air-portable by C-130s or other similar cargo aircraft.

The Terrex's layout is conventional: the driver sits front left and the power pack is to the right. This leaves the rest of the vehicle clear for the troop compartment, which is provided with a power-operated ramp and roof hatches.

Various weapon systems can be fitted on the roof, including a remote weapon station armed with a 40mm automatic grenade launcher and a 7.62mm coaxial machine gun or a complete stabilized turret armed with a 25mm M242 Bushmaster cannon and 7.62mm coaxial machine gun. Additional 7.62mm machine guns can be mounted over the rear troop compartment. In addition, the vehicle can be configured to carry varying combat payloads, from turret-based weapon stations (including 105 mm tank guns) to rocket launchers. The modular top deck allows for quick configuration changes to be carried out.

The Terrex AV-81 uses a patented independent double wishbone suspension, which greatly improves ground mobility and ride comfort over rough terrain. The use of automatic traction control and the capacity for large footprint off-road tires enables it to travel at unprecedented speeds in soft ground conditions.

The vehicle has a double hull with an external V-hull that improves mine blast survivability. Add-on armour provides further protection for troops. It is also capable of providing full NBC (nuclear, biological, chemical) protection in extreme operational conditions.

The standard equipment includes a powered steering on four wheels at the front, a central tyre-pressure inflation system, an anti-lock braking system and an NBC defensive/protective system but there are also many other options for fitted equipment and vehicle gear available.

In its baseline configuration, the AV-81 Terrex is fully amphibious: two water jets mounted on either side at the back of the hull propel the vehicle through water at 10 km/h.

Variants
The following known variants are in service:

 Command Variant
 40mm AGL/7.62mm Coaxial MG Variant
 .50 calibre HMG Variant
 SPIKE ATGM Variant
 Pioneer Variant
 Medical Variant
 Reconnaissance, Surveillance, and Target Acquisition (RSTA) Variant
 STORM Variant

Incidents
On 23 November 2016, nine Terrex vehicles from the Singapore Armed Forces (SAF), which were used for a military exercise in Taiwan, were seized while in port at Hong Kong, resulting in heightened political tensions between Singapore and China. They were initially impounded at an outdoor storage yard of a Hong Kong Customs and Excise Department storage facility in Tuen Mun, but by 6 December, they had been moved indoors.

On 24 January 2017, the Hong Kong government stated that it would allow the detained Terrexes to return to Singapore. The vehicles were returned to Singapore on 30 January 2017.

Operators

  
 Ghana Army – 19 Sentinel IIs in total, 6 Sentinel IIs in 8x8 equipped with Elbit Systems UT30 turrets with 10 Sentinel IIs in 6x6 for recon missions
  
 Singapore Army – 435

References
Notes

External links

Official Site (Archive)
Otokar Yavuz online catalogue (Archive)
TERREX 2: From Ship to Shore - SAIC
One35th.com with specifications
Video links

Armoured fighting vehicles of Singapore
Amphibious armoured fighting vehicles
Armoured fighting vehicles of the post–Cold War period
Wheeled armoured fighting vehicles
Otokar products
Eight-wheeled vehicles
Military vehicles introduced in the 2000s
Wheeled amphibious armoured fighting vehicles
Wheeled armoured personnel carriers
Armoured personnel carriers of the post–Cold War period